YPA could refer to:
 Prince Albert (Glass Field) Airport, Canada, IATA code
 Yugoslav People's Army, 1945-1992
 Yemen Ports Authority
 FC YPA, association football club from Ylivieska, Finland
 Yale Postdoctoral Association

See also 
 Ura (disambiguation)